Richard Jesus (da Silva) Salazar  (born September 6, 1981) is a Venezulean former professional baseball pitcher who is currently a coach in the Minnesota Twins minor league system.

He was drafted by the Baltimore Orioles in the 13th round of the 2001 MLB Draft out of Miami-Dade College. He played in the Orioles farm system through 2007, reaching AAA with the Norfolk Tides. In 2005, he was suspended 15 games for violating baseball's minor league steroid policy.

Upon his release by the Orioles organization, he began playing independent league baseball in the American Association of Independent Professional Baseball with the Wichita Wingnuts (2008-2009), Shreveport-Bossier Captains (2009-2011) and the Sioux City Explorers (2011-2012). He also played with the Rockland Boulders of the Can-Am League.

He was on the roster for the Spain national baseball team in the 2013 World Baseball Classic.

References

External links

1981 births
2013 World Baseball Classic players
Living people
Baseball pitchers
Baseball players suspended for drug offenses
Bluefield Orioles players
Bowie Baysox players
Caribes de Anzoátegui players
Delmarva Shorebirds players
Frederick Keys players
Gulf Coast Orioles players
Miami Dade College alumni
Miami Dade Sharks baseball players
Navegantes del Magallanes players
Norfolk Tides players
Baseball players from Caracas
Rockland Boulders players
Shreveport-Bossier Captains players
Sioux City Explorers players
Tiburones de La Guaira players
American expatriate baseball players in Venezuela
Venezuelan Summer League Venoco 1/2 players
Wichita Wingnuts players